Stelestylis is a genus of plants first described as a genus in 1881. All the known species are native to northern South America (Venezuela and the Guianas).

 Species
 Stelestylis anomala Harling - Aragua + Carabobo States in Venezuela
 Stelestylis coriacea Drude - probably Brazil; original type destroyed in Second World War, precise location locale unknown
 Stelestylis stylaris (Gleason) Harling - Venezuela, Guyana
 Stelestylis surinamensis Harling - Suriname, French Guiana

References

Cyclanthaceae
Pandanales genera
Taxa named by Carl Georg Oscar Drude